Stéphane Jean-Abel Michel Charbonnier (21 August 1967 – 7 January 2015), better known as Charb, was a French satirical caricaturist and journalist. He was assassinated during the Charlie Hebdo shooting on 7 January 2015.

He worked for several newspapers and magazines, joining Charlie Hebdo in 1992 and becoming the director of publication in 2009. Due to the publication of Muhammad cartoons, Charb became subject to death threats from extremist Muslims. From the time the magazine was firebombed in 2011, he lived under police protection until his assassination. The police officer protecting Charb on 7 January 2015 was also killed by the shooters.

Early life
Stéphane Charbonnier was born in Conflans-Sainte-Honorine on 21 August 1967 and raised in Pontoise, the son of Michel Jean-Marie Charbonnier. His mother, Denise Renée-Marie Charbonnier, née Ouvrard, worked as a secretary and his father worked as a technician for Postes, télégraphes et téléphones. His grandparents, Jean and Lucette Marie-Andrée (née Brunet) owned a grocery store in Pontoise. Stéphane's talent for drawing was discovered in school and he published his first drawings in Echo des collégiens at the age of fourteen. He continued to draw while studying at Lycée Camille Pissarro.

Career

In the late 1980s he started working as a cartoonist.

Later freelance work by Charb included cartoons for L'Écho des savanes, Télérama, and L'Humanité. He joined Charlie Hebdo in 1992 and was its director of publication from 2009 until his death on 7 January 2015.

Charb's comic strip, Maurice et Patapon featured Maurice, a dog described by the newspaper Libération as leftist, pacifist, outgoing, and omnisexual, and a cat, Patapon, who is conservative, violent, asexual, and perverse. Libération described the series as philosophical and scatological. Charb also drew the character "Marcel Keuf, le flic" ("Marcel Pig, the cop") in Fluide Glacial. Charb's column in Charlie Hebdo was titled "Charb n'aime pas les gens" ("Charb does not like people"). One of his regular pieces was the monthly La fatwa de l'Ayatollah Charb (The Fatwa of the Ayatollah Charb) in Fluide Glacial.

In 2007 and 2008, he was a set cartoonist on the talk show T'empêches tout le monde de dormir on television channel M6. He was a long-time supporter of the French Communist Party.

He also drew cartoons for anti-racism organizations such as MRAP.

2011 bomb attack and subsequent threats 
On 2 November 2011, Charlie Hebdo was firebombed just before its 3 November issue was due to be published; the issue was entitled Charia Hebdo and satirically featured the Islamic prophet, Muhammad as guest-editor. Charb and two of his co-workers at Charlie Hebdo subsequently received police protection.

In September 2012, a man was arrested in La Rochelle, allegedly for having called for the beheading of Charb on a Jihadist website.

In a 2012 interview Charb was quoted as saying, "I am not afraid of reprisals, I have no children, no wife, no car, no debt. It might sound a bit pompous, but I'd prefer to die on my feet than to live on my knees."

Al-Qaeda put Charb on their "most-wanted list" in 2013, after he edited an edition of Charlie Hebdo that satirised radical Mohammedans. Also on that list was Lars Vilks, as well as three Jyllands-Posten staff members: Kurt Westergaard (whose cartoons Charlie Hebdo had published), Carsten Juste, and Flemming Rose. Being a sport shooter, Charb applied for permit to be able to carry a firearm for self-defence. The application was, however, not approved.

On the week of the Charlie Hebdo shooting, a Charb illustration in issue for that week observed that there had not been any terrorist attacks in France, with a caricatured armed jihadist fighter turning a customary French phrase to malicious use: "Wait! ... we still have until the end of January to present our wishes" — a reference to the French tradition of offering New Year's greetings until the end of January.

Beliefs 
Charbonnier was an atheist and pacifist.

Two days prior to his death, Charb had completed an essay on Islamophobia. One year after the massacre, it was translated to and published in English, with a foreword by Adam Gopnik, under the title Open Letter: On Blasphemy, Islamophobia, and the True Enemies of Free Expression.

Death 

Charb was killed, with seven of his colleagues, two police officers, and two other people on 7 January 2015 when a pair of gunmen stormed the Charlie Hebdo newspaper offices in Paris. One of the police officers killed, Franck Brinsolaro, was Charb's bodyguard.

His funeral was held in Pontoise and included speeches by Luz, Patrick Pelloux, Jean-Luc Mélenchon, and Pierre Laurent. The government ministers Christiane Taubira, Najat Vallaud-Belkacem, and Fleur Pellerin also attended the funeral.

Personal life
Jeannette Bougrab, a human rights attorney and former Minister for Youth and Community Life, indicated after his death that she had been Charb's life partner. His family disputed this and, in a statement issued by his brother on 10 January 2015, denied the existence of any "interpersonal commitment" between Charb and Jeannette Bougrab while some of his colleagues confirmed it.

Publications 
 Je suis très tolérant, MC Productions/Charb, 1996
 Maurice et Patapon, Volumes I (2005)  II (2006), III (2007), IV (2009), Hoebeke
 Attention ça tache, Casterman, 2004 (with foreword by Philippe Geluck)
 Charb n'aime pas les gens : chroniques politiques, 1996–2002, Agone, 2002
 Collectif, Mozart qu'on assassine, Albin Michel, 2006, with Catherine Meurisse, Riss, Luz, Tignous et Jul
 J'aime pas les fumeurs, Hoëbeke, 2007
 J'aime pas la retraite, 2008 (with Patrick Pelloux)
 C'est la Faute à la société, 12 bis, 2008
 Dico Sarko, éditions 12 bis, 2008
 Le Petit Livre rouge de Sarko, 12 bis, 2009
 Eternuer dans le chou-fleur et autres métaphores sexuelles à travers le monde, text by Antonio Fischetti, Les Échappés, 2009
 Marx, mode d'emploi, La Découverte, 2009 (with Daniel Bensaïd)
 Le Cahier de vacances de Charlie Hebdo, Les Échappés, 2009, with Catherine Meurisse, Riss and Luz|Luz
 Les Fatwas de Charb, Les Échappés, 2009
 C'est pas là qu'on fait caca! Maurice et Patapon for children, Les Échappés, 2010
 Les dictons du jour, agenda 2011, Les Échappés, 2010
 Sarko, le kit de survie, 12 bis, 2010
 Marcel Keuf, le flic, Les Échappés, 2011
 La salle des profs, 12 bis, 2012
 La vie de Mahomet, Les Échappés, 2013 (with Zineb)
 Lettre aux escrocs de l'islamophobie qui font le jeu des racistes, éditions Les Échappés, Lettre A, 2015 (postum)  
 Illustrations for Petit cours d'autodéfense intellectuelle (Short class in Intellectual Self-Defence) by Normand Baillargeon, and Petit cours d'autodéfense en économie (éditions Lux; Short Class in Economic Self-Defence)  by Jim Stanford.
 Open Letter: On Blasphemy, Islamophobia, and the True Enemies of Free Expression (foreword by Adam Gopnik), Little, Brown, & Co., 2016

See also

List of journalists killed in Europe

References 

1967 births
2015 deaths
People from Conflans-Sainte-Honorine
Assassinated French journalists
Charlie Hebdo people
French caricaturists
French satirists
French atheists
French communists
Journalists killed in France
Terrorism deaths in France
Victims of the Charlie Hebdo shooting
Victims of Islamic terrorism